The West Indies cricket team toured New Zealand in November and December 2020 to play two Tests and three Twenty20 International (T20I) matches. The Test series formed part of the inaugural 2019–2021 ICC World Test Championship. In August 2020, New Zealand Cricket confirmed that the tour was going ahead, and were working with their government to comply with biosecurity during the COVID-19 pandemic. On 29 September 2020, New Zealand Cricket confirmed the schedule against the West Indies.

It was the first live home cricket coverage for the New Zealand broadcaster Spark Sport, after they won the New Zealand Cricket broadcast rights against the previous broadcasters Sky Sport.

New Zealand won the first two T20I matches to take an unassailable lead in the series. The third and final match was abandoned after 2.2 overs of play due to rain, with New Zealand winning the series 2–0. New Zealand won the first Test match by an innings and 134 runs, with their captain Kane Williamson scoring 251 runs in the first innings. New Zealand also won the second Test match to take the series 2–0, and extend their unbeaten run at home in Test cricket to fifteen matches.

Squads

Nkrumah Bonner, Joshua Da Silva, Preston McSween, Shayne Moseley, Raymon Reifer and Jayden Seales were also named as reserves for the West Indies' Test squad. On 17 October 2020, Dwayne Bravo suffered an injury during the 2020 Indian Premier League, and was ruled out of the West Indies' squad. Romario Shepherd was named as Bravo's replacement. On 28 October 2020, the squad departed from Barbados for the tour. The squad arrived in New Zealand on 30 October 2020, after a 54-hour journey. In November 2020, Roston Chase was named as the vice-captain of the West Indies' Test side, with Nicholas Pooran retaining his vice-captaincy role for the T20I matches.

Tim Southee was named the captain of New Zealand's T20I squad for the first two matches. Southee, along with Kyle Jamieson and Ross Taylor were not included for the third T20I match to prepare for the Test series, with Doug Bracewell, Mark Chapman and Scott Kuggeleijn added to New Zealand's squad for the third T20I.

On 25 November 2020, Colin de Grandhomme was ruled out of the Test series due to an injury, with Daryl Mitchell named as Grandhomme's replacement. Mitchell Santner was added to New Zealand's squad for the first Test, as cover for Ajaz Patel. Santner was also named as captain of New Zealand's squad for the third T20I, taking over from Tim Southee who was rested for the Test series. Ahead of the Test series, Devon Conway was added to New Zealand's squad, covering for BJ Watling who suffered a hamstring injury. Watling was later ruled out of the first Test due to his injury, with Tom Blundell named as the team's wicket-keeper for the match.

Ahead of the second Test match, Shane Dowrich and Kemar Roach both left the West Indies' squad due to personal reasons. Joshua Da Silva was added to the squad, as a replacement wicket-keeper for Dowrich. On 10 December 2020, it was announced that Kane Williamson would miss the second Test, due to the birth of his first child, with Tom Latham named as captain of the New Zealand team.

Practice matches
The West Indies played two practice matches against the New Zealand A team in November in Queenstown. The West Indies A team also played two matches against the New Zealand A team in December 2020; one in Mount Maunganui, and the other match in Nelson. Both fixtures were unofficial Test matches, with first-class status.

T20I series

1st T20I

2nd T20I

3rd T20I

Test series

1st Test

2nd Test

Notes

References

External links
 Series home at ESPN Cricinfo

2020 in New Zealand cricket
2020 in West Indian cricket
International cricket competitions in 2020–21
West Indian cricket tours of New Zealand